Spreepark is a former amusement park in the north of the Plänterwald in the Berlin district Treptow-Köpenick (formerly part of the GDR-controlled East Berlin). It was also known by its earlier name Kulturpark Plänterwald Berlin.

History

1969-1989 – Kulturpark Plänterwald
The entertainment park was opened in 1969 as Kulturpark Plänterwald, covering an area of 29.5 hectares. The area is situated in the north of the Plänterwald, next to the river Spree. It was the only constant entertainment park in the GDR, and the only such park in either East or West Berlin.

1989-2001 – Spreepark Berlin
The VEB Kulturpark Berlin was de-nationalized in 1991, after the reunification, by the municipal authorities of Berlin. Out of a total of seven applicants, the company Spreepark Berlin  GmbH received the contract to run the park. Crucially, the references of Norbert Witte of the company were not properly checked.

Under the Spreepark GmbH, new attractions were added and visitor numbers reached 1.5 million per annum. Later, the concept was changed, and the park was gradually transformed into a more Western-style amusement park. An entrance fee (adults: 29 DM, children: 27 DM) covering all individual attractions was charged, instead of visitors paying for each individual ride, as had previously been the case.

The asphalted surface around the Ferris wheel was taken up and converted into a water landscape. Roller coasters, two game water courses, a stage, a Western town and an English village were later added to the park.

Beginning 1999, the park had to cope with large debts. The increase in the admission fee to 30 DM per person and the lack of parking contributed to a drop in visitor numbers, until, in 2001, only 400,000 visitors entered the park.

In 2001, Spreepark GmbH announced that they were insolvent.

After 2002
On 18 January 2002, Norbert Witte, together with his family and closest coworkers, moved to Lima, Peru. They shipped six attractions (Fliegender Teppich, Butterfly, Spider, Baby-Flug, Wild River, and Jet Star) in 20 shipping containers, having been allowed to do so by the authorities, who believed they were being sent for repair.

Since 2002, the park has not opened for visitors. In August 2002, the park was declared insolvent. Debts at a level of €11,000,000 remained, and the area was allowed to fall into disrepair. The Ferris wheel was dismantled in 2021 and the parts kept for potential re-use. The remains of other attractions can still be found on-site.

In 2011, a scene for the action film Hanna was filmed at the park, as well as the music video for the single "Run Dry" by German band Sizarr.

Norbert Witte failed in his attempt to run a "Lunapark" in Lima. On 19 May 2004, he was sentenced to seven years in jail for attempting to smuggle 180 kg of cocaine with a value of £14 million from Peru to Germany in the masts of the Fliegender Teppich (Flying Carpet) ride. In October 2006, a Peruvian court sentenced Wittes' son, Marcel Witte, to 20 years for drug smuggling.

After 2011, guided tours were offered to the public at restricted times.

In March 2014, the City of Berlin bought the Spreepark, and guided tours ended. The city chose Grün Berlin to restore the park, and their plan, presented to the public in 2018, is to restore it with an overlay of cultural and ecological content.

On the evening of 10 August 2014, major parts of the park were destroyed in a fire. Reports indicated that firefighters discovered two blazes 200 m apart that soon merged. This indicates the fires may have been deliberately set.

Gallery

References

Further reading

External links

 Berliner Spreepark.de, historical and fan site 
 Spreepark.de, another historical site, archived on 31 August 2019 
 https://web.archive.org/web/20070320221101/http://www.kulturpark.net/
 http://urbexsession.com/en/spreepark/
 http://www.permakultur-zentrum-berlin.de/
 http://urbanexploration.nl/spreepark.php
 Showdown in Spreepark on Resident Advisor
 Obsidian Urbex Photography | Photos and information (in English)

 https://berlinblog.dk/2018/03/27/den-forladte-forlystelsespark-spreepark/ 
 Dread and Circuses: The Sad Story Of Spreepark Berlin

Amusement parks in Germany
Buildings and structures in Treptow-Köpenick
1969 establishments in East Germany
Defunct amusement parks in Germany
Amusement parks opened in 1969
Amusement parks closed in 2002
2002 disestablishments in Germany
Modern ruins